Arbabi may refer to:
 Arbabi-ye Olya, Fars Province
 Arbabi-ye Sofla, Fars Province
 Arbabi, Hirmand, Sistan and Baluchestan Province
 Arbabi (Deh-e Arbabi), Hirmand, Sistan and Baluchestan Province